Paul Doughty Bartlett (August 14, 1907 – October 11, 1997) was an American chemist.

Bartlett was born in Ann Arbor, Michigan and grew up in Indianapolis. He received his B.A. from Amherst College in 1928. After his graduation from Harvard with James Bryant Conant, Bartlett worked at the Rockefeller Institute and the University of Minnesota. Most of his career was spent at Harvard. Among other achievements, Bartlett was co-author with Lawrence H. Knox of a classic paper on organic reaction mechanisms.  After his retirement in 1972, he started his second career at Texas Christian University.

He was elected a Fellow of the American Academy of Arts and Sciences in 1946 and the United States National Academy of Sciences in 1947. He was awarded the  Willard Gibbs Award in 1963, National Medal of Science in 1968, and the John Price Wetherill Medal in 1970. In 1969, Paul Doughty Bartlett was elected as member of the German Academy of Sciences Leopoldina. He was elected to the American Philosophical Society in 1978.

References

External links
 
 Oral History interview transcript with Paul Bartlett on 18 July 1978, American Institute of Physics, Niels Bohr Library and Archives
National Academy of Sciences Biographical Memoir

1907 births
1997 deaths
20th-century American chemists
Amherst College alumni
National Medal of Science laureates
Harvard University faculty
Texas Christian University faculty
Fellows of the American Academy of Arts and Sciences
People from Ann Arbor, Michigan
Harvard University alumni
Members of the German Academy of Sciences Leopoldina

Members of the American Philosophical Society